Bosniaks of Croatia are one of the ethnic minorities of the Republic of Croatia. In the 2011 census, there were 31,479 Bosniaks or 0.73% of the total population, making them the third largest ethnic group in the country. 
Bosniaks are officially recognized as an autochthonous national minority, and as such, they elect a special representative to the Croatian Parliament, shared with members of four other national minorities.
Most Bosniaks live in the capital Zagreb (8,119), Istria County (6,146) and Primorje-Gorski Kotar County (4,877).

Notable people
Lara Antić, singer (on her mother's side)
Denis Bajramović, basketball coach and former player 
Dubravko Bautović, singer and a reality TV star (on his mother's side; his uncle is Safet Isović) 
Krešo Bengalka, rapper (on his father's side)
Enis Bešlagić, actor
Hamed Bangoura, radio presenter (on his mother's side)
Amar Bukvić, actor
Mersad Berber, painter
Amela Čilić, tv reporter
Tarik Filipović, actor and tv presenter
Alen Halilović, football player
La Lana, singer (on her mother's side)
Amina Kajtaz, swimmer
Indira Levak, singer (on her mother's side)
Daria Lorenci Flatz, actress
(on her father's side)
Ćamila Mičijević, handball player
Jasmin Mujdža, football player
Mensur Mujdža, football player
Mustafa Nadarević, actor
Esad Ribić, comic book artist
Elvis Sarić, football player 
Darijo Srna, former football player (on his father's side)
Fehim Vukotić, painter and a judoka
 Zlatan Zuhrić, actor and comedian (on his father's side)

See also
Islam in Croatia
Islamic Secondary School "Dr. Ahmed Smajlović"
Gunja Mosque

References

 
Bosniak diaspora
Ethnic groups in Croatia
Muslim communities in Europe